Fantasy Twin is a collection of fantasy novels by L. Sprague de Camp and Stanley G. Weinbaum.  It was published in 1951 by Fantasy Publishing Company, Inc. in an edition of 300 copies.  The book is an omnibus of de Camps's The Undesired Princess and Weinbaum's The Dark Other, created by combining unbound sheets from the publisher's previous editions of the two volumes.

References

1953 American novels
American fantasy novels
Fantasy Publishing Company, Inc. books